Cummings Creek flows into the Black River near Hawkinsville, New York.

References 

Rivers of New York (state)
Rivers of Oneida County, New York